List of people called by the Colombian Supreme Court in the Colombian parapolitics scandal. Going to court doesn't mean being indicted.

Mario Uribe, Álvaro Uribe's cousin, political ally and former senator
Horacio Serpa, former presidential candidate
Luis Ernesto Mejía, former minister
Álvaro Araújo Noguera
Luis Humberto Gomez Gallo, former President of Congress
Sergio Araújo Castro
Coronel Hernán Mejía
Lucas Gnecco Cerchar, former governor of Cesar Department
Juan Carlos Vives
Bernardo Hoyos, former mayor of Barranquilla
Eleonora Pineda
Salomón Saade, ex congresista
Javier Castro Alfaro
Álvaro Castro Socarrás
Andrés Camilo Castro
Rodith Trespalacios
Édgar Arce
John Medina Rojas
Cesar Giraldo
José Luis Laborde Gómez
Coronel Orlando Páez Barón
Luis Alberto Monsalvo
José Gnecco Cerchar former Senator of Colombia
Lilio de Gnecco
Álvaro Morón
Israel Obregón
José Elías Cruz Romero
Gerardo Jaime
Santander Mejía Araújo
Ricardo Chajin
Luis Enrique Mora Zequeria
Óscar Pavón
Libardo García
Jorge Vega
Hernán Baute Arrázola
Rafael Díaz Pérez
Luis Fernando Barrios
Martha Stumo
Dino Gravini Donado
Leonardo Melo
Andrés Mesa
José Morillo
José María Sierra
Carlos Tomás Severino
José Domingo Dávila
Martha Romero Villa
Fernando Piscioti
José David González
Tico Velaides
Lucho Bruges
Aníbal Martínez
Jaime Martínez
Simón Villamizar
Edilberto López Campo
Rafael Díaz
Isa Eljaude
Roberto Martínez
Handy Stumo
Enrique Osorio de la Rosa
Augusto Castro Pacheco
Libardo Duarte
Guillermo Sánchez Quintero
José María Barrera
Rafael Bolaños former Governor of Cesar Department
Víctor Ochoa 
Juana Ramírez

References
 El Colombiano newspaper:Going to court doesn't mean being indicted

Colombian Supreme court in the Parapolitics Scandal
Supreme court in the Parapolitics Scandal
Colombian parapolitics scandal